Fundamental matrix may refer to:
 Fundamental matrix (computer vision)
 Fundamental matrix (linear differential equation)
 Fundamental matrix (absorbing Markov chain)